Shea Guthrie (born July 30, 1987) is a Canadian Ice hockey forward, currently playing for the Coventry Blaze of the Elite Ice Hockey League (EIHL).

He was selected 76th overall in the 2005 NHL Entry Draft by the New York Islanders.

Playing career 

Guthrie was born in Carleton Place, Ontario, Canada. He started his career in 2005 playing for four seasons at Clarkson University before moving to the ECHL in 2009 with the Utah Grizzlies and Florida Everblades.

On June 21, 2011 it was announced that Guthrie would be joining the Coventry Blaze of the British Elite Ice Hockey League.

On April 9, 2013 it was confirmed that Guthrie would be joining IF Troja/Ljungby of the HockeyAllsvenskan.

On November 15, 2013 it was announced that Guthrie would be returning to Coventry Blaze.

Career statistics

Awards and honours

References

External links 

1987 births
Living people
Canadian ice hockey right wingers
Coventry Blaze players
Florida Everblades players
Ice hockey people from Ontario
People from Carleton Place
Utah Grizzlies (AHL) players
New York Islanders draft picks
Canadian expatriate ice hockey players in England